Holy Boy's Cave is a cave in the British Overseas Territory of Gibraltar. It is located on the eastern side of the Rock, near Cave S.

Description
The current shape of the Rock of Gibraltar is the result of nature but it is also the work of the Royal Engineers. They would tunnel and smooth out any likely looking climbing surfaces. When they did this they would sometimes discover new caves like Holy Boys Cave.

The History of the Royal Sappers and Miners recounts the cave being discovered in 1711 by some miners of the corps, while scarping the back of the Rock:-

"It was situated on its eastern side, and its extent classed it among some of the largest within the area of the fortress. Removing the rank vegetation which had over-grown its mouth, a small chasm was bared, opening into a cave containing several chambers and grottos, entered by narrow funnel-shaped crevices, some so low and winding that ingress could only be obtained by crawling through the long misty passages on all-fours. Seemingly, the roofs were supported by a number of pillars, which the dripping of ages had concreted into all shapes and sizes and into all degrees of hardness, from patches of soft silvered powder to the bold undulated columnar stalactite. On the floors, at different heights, were stalagmites, some peering up like needles, and others, swollen and grotesque, rose from frostlike cushions of delicate finish, which, on being rudely touched, dissolved instantly into water. The hall at the extremity was divided into two oblong recesses, floored by a deep layer of vegetable earth, where not a clump of the lowliest weed or a blade of grass was seen to show that vigor was in the earth. Nothing seemed capable of living there but a colony of bats, some flapping about on lazy wing, and others torpid; no process to be active, but the cold one of petrifaction, which, in nature's own confused method, had elaborated throughout the cavern, columns and pinnacles and cushions ... and concretions, some as fleecy as snow, others as crisp as hoar-frost, and others of an opal hue as transparent as crystal. All  was rich, beautiful, and sparkling. It was a marvel to adventurers, but unfit for habitation; yet, in later years, this hole of the mountain was possessed by a Spanish goat-herd, who reached his solitude by the same threadlike but dangerous tracks as his goats. There might the recluse have lived till his bones fell among the petrifaction, but he was at length expelled from its gloomy precincts on account of his contraband iniquities."

References
This page uses freely licensed text generously shared by underground-gibraltar.com

Caves of Gibraltar